Las Cabañas de Castilla is a hamlet of Osorno la Mayor located in the province of Palencia, Castile and León, Spain. According to the 2007 census (INE), the village has a population of 40 inhabitants.

Monuments 
Tower of Las Cabañas: Castle built at middle of 15th century by Castaneda family. Besides belonging to Castaneda family, Osorno's Earl and Villatorre's Marqués.

Hamlets in the Province of Palencia